Evelyn Anne Taylor  is a former New Zealand netball administrator, coach and umpire. From 1978 to 1987 she was president of Netball New Zealand and between 1989 and 1999 she was vice-president and president of the International Netball Federation.

Early life
Taylor attended Waitaki Girls' High School in Oamaru, the largest town in the North Otago region, on the South Island of New Zealand. She obtained a diploma in physical education at the University of Otago in 1958, where she captained the university netball club and was on the university sports council. After graduating, she taught physical education at the Hamilton Girls' High School in Hamilton on the North Island, and volunteered at Hamilton YWCA.

Netball administration
Taylor became a certified netball coach and umpire. She was an umpire for the first televised netball test match in New Zealand in 1969. In 1978 she was appointed as president of Netball New Zealand, a position she held until 1987. During her tenure the association significantly raised the profile of netball in New Zealand, attracting both media coverage and commercial sponsorship. In part, she achieved this by arranging test matches in the March-April period, at a time when other sport on television was limited, even though that meant scheduling international matches during the domestic netball season, which had not been done before. Taylor was responsible for starting a league for club teams, sponsored by the Bendon Group, a lingerie company, and for obtaining sponsorship from Nestlé under the Milo brand for test matches against teams from overseas. Her decision to move Netball New Zealand's headquarters to Auckland from the capital Wellington facilitated access to sponsors and she also hired a marketing company. Attracting sponsors was helped by the success of the Silver Ferns, the New Zealand national netball team, who won the 1987 World Netball Championships, held in Glasgow, Scotland.

In 1985, while still with Netball New Zealand, Taylor also became the executive officer of the Oceania Netball Federation, a position she held until 1995. She was appointed vice-president of the International Federation of Netball Associations, now called World Netball, in 1989 and subsequently became president, serving until 1999. Other positions that she has held have included membership of the New Zealand Council for Recreation and Sport, the Hillary Commission, now known as Sport New Zealand, and the New Zealand Sports Drug Agency. She also chaired Bowls Waikato.

Awards and honours
Taylor was made a life member of Netball New Zealand in 1987 and in the same year received a Halberg Award for her services to sport. In 1988 she was made an Officer of the Order of the British Empire (OBE) in the Queen's Birthday Honours. In 2000, in celebration of the 75th anniversary of netball in New Zealand, she was given the lifetime contribution award. In 2012 she was inducted into the Wall of Fame of her alma mater, the University of Otago.

References

Living people
Date of birth missing (living people)
Year of birth missing (living people)
New Zealand netball umpires
New Zealand netball administrators
New Zealand Officers of the Order of the British Empire
People educated at Waitaki Girls' High School
People from Oamaru
University of Otago alumni